Robert Alexander Schutzmann (6 May 1924 – 19 January 2015) was an Austrian inventor and television presenter.  He was also known as Bob Symes, and sometimes credited-as Robert Symes-Shutzmann or Bob Symes-Shutzmann.

Early life
Symes, who came from a Jewish family, was the son of Dr. Herbert Schutzmann, a lawyer and ardent Zionist, and his mother was writer Lola Blonder. Educated at a Realgymnasium, Vienna and the Institut auf dem Rosenberg in St Gallen, Switzerland, during holidays he would return to the family estate where he developed a private narrow gauge railway that transported timber.

Career

Royal Navy
After the death of his father in 1937, and the annexation of Austria by Nazi Germany in March 1938 via the Anschluss, his mother led Symes and his younger sister to Trieste and onwards to the Jewish-section of Palestine. Whilst his mother and sister travelled onwards to the United States, Symes contacted a former British diplomat in Vienna, a family friend who was once stationed in Cairo.

After gaining the required letter of recommendation, due to his ability to speak German, French, Arabic and English, Symes was commissioned as a Lieutenant into the Royal Navy, operating Motor Torpedo Boats (MTBs) in the Mediterranean while based in Alexandria. Quickly rising to command his own boat, he broke anti-torpedo measures in a raid on Tripoli. After rising to the rank of Lieutenant Commander, he took part in protecting the landings that led to the liberation of Crete.

Broadcasting
After leaving the Royal Navy, he became the Dutch airline KLM's press officer in London.

In 1953 he joined the BBC's Overseas Service for Germany based in Broadcasting House, London, where his ability to speak various languages quickly established his career. After two years as head of broadcasting at the BBC's Eastern Region Colonial Office in Nigeria from 1956, he returned as a producer and broadcast manager to London.

His interest in engineering and technology resulted in his joining the Tomorrow's World presentation team, alongside Raymond Baxter. Over the following 30 years Symes became a familiar face to British TV audiences across a number of engineering, technology and railway related productions, including Model World (in 1975) which was dedicated to the hobby of modelling, and then co-presented with Mary-Jean Hasler Making Tracks a series dedicated to little-known rail lines and networks worldwide, and which specialised in steam operations.

In 1982 he presented the BBC Horizon programme; "The Mysterious Mr. Tesla" about the electrical engineer Nikola Tesla.

Environmental techniques that Symes had developed for environmental living resulted in the 1990s series The House that Bob Built, in which a "green" dwelling was constructed at Milton Keynes.

Symes was a familiar face with the German-speaking audiences, through his presentation of the Bahnorama railways films, based around German, Austrian, Swiss and occasionally re-dubbed British railway footage, produced by the Austrian-based SH-Production & Co KEG company which he co-founded.

Other interests
Until its closure on Easter Monday 2014, he was patron of 'Hospital Radio Lion' based at the Royal Surrey County Hospital in Guildford.

Engineering and inventing
Symes created inventions in metal engineering, and held patents in plumbing. He was also instrumental in setting up the Institute of Patentees and Inventors in 1989, which he chaired twice, and then launched National Invent-A-Thing Week in 1992.

His books on the subject included: Powered Flight (1958); Crikey! It Works (1992); The Young Engineer’s Handbook (1993); and Eureka! The Book of Inventing (1994, with Robin Bootle).

Railways
His lifelong interest in railways included helping to set up private railways in Switzerland and across the United Kingdom. He established The Border Union Railway Company in 1969, to restore, maintain and introduce new services along the recently abandoned Waverley Line between Edinburgh and Carlisle.

His family opened the railway every year to raise funds for the BBC's Children in Need, where visitors could take tea and cake and also see his collection of vintage tractors. Symes was also the president of a Guildford-based model railway circle called Astolat MRC.

Politics
Symes twice stood unsuccessfully for Parliament in Mid Sussex as a Liberal candidate in February and October 1974. He was later selected by the Conservatives as a European parliamentary candidate.

Awards
Symes held the Special Constabulary Long Service Medal as a Special Constable. He was made a companion of the Royal Aeronautical Society, and awarded the Knight's Cross (first class) by the President of Austria, in recognition of his work in promoting Anglo-Austrian relations.

Personal life
In 1947, he visited the BBC to seek out Monica Chapman, who produced the military request programme Forces Prom to thank her for playing the choices that he had submitted. Chapman's mother gave to Symes her own ticket to a Beethoven concert that she was to attend that evening with her daughter, who subsequently married Bob six weeks later. The couple agreed on the surname Symes for their married life together. Monica later became Producer of the BBC Radio 4 programmes Desert Island Discs and Your Concert Choice, and the couple had a daughter Roberta.

Monica died in 1998. In January 2007 he married Sheila Gunn, then Works Manager at Boston Lodge, on the Ffestiniog Railway. Symes and his family moved from East Horsley, where he had spent many years, to Wales in August 2014. He died there of cancer on 19 January 2015.

References

External links
Bob Symes' youtube channel
[Bob Symes' garden train set]
Gauge 1 Website

Royal Navy officers of World War II
Austrian emigrants to the United Kingdom
British television presenters
British inventors
British people associated with Heritage Railways
Recipients of the Decoration for Services to the Republic of Austria
1924 births
2015 deaths
British special constables
Austrian expatriates in Switzerland
Institut auf dem Rosenberg alumni